The Singapore Sevens is an annual rugby sevens tournament contested by national teams. It was first hosted as part of the IRB World Sevens Series in 2002. The Standard Chartered Bank was the original title sponsor. It was effectively replaced in the calendar by the Australian Sevens for the 2006-07 season.

The tournament returned as an official event within the Asian Sevens Series in 2013. Singapore then secured a four-year deal to host a leg of the Sevens World Series starting from the 2015–16 season. Singapore's rights to host a leg of the Sevens World Series was extended for a further four years until 2023, before the 2020 event was cancelled due to the COVID-19 pandemic. 

The tournament in Singapore was cancelled again in 2021 due to ongoing impacts of the COVID-19 pandemic to protect the health and safety of players, fans, and staff. 

Rugby sevens returned in 2022, the ninth time that the Sevens World Series was hosted in Singapore, when Fiji defeated New Zealand to win their third Singapore Sevens title.

Results

By placing
Summary of top-4 placings at the Singapore Sevens on the World Sevens Series (updated to 2022):

Results by year
{| class="wikitable" style="font-size:90%; text-align: center;"
|-
!Year
! Venue
! colspan=3|Cup final
! colspan=3|Placings
! style="padding:1px;"|Ref
|- bgcolor=lightgrey style="line-height:9px; font-size:85%; padding:0px;"
|style="border-left:0px;" | ||
|style="width:9em; font-weight:bold;" | Winner
|style="width:3.5em; font-weight:bold;" | Score
|style="width:9em; font-weight:bold;" | Runner-up
|style="width:9em; font-weight:bold; padding-right:0; border-right:0px; text-align:right;" |Semi
|style="width:9em; font-weight:bold; padding-left:0; border-left:0px; text-align:left;" |finalists
|colspan=2 style="width:12em; font-weight:bold; text-align:left;" | Plate·Bowl·Shield
|-
| style="border-left:3px solid #28368C;"| 2002
| National Stadium
|
|21–17
|
| style="border-right:0px;"| 
| style="border-left:0px;"| 
|style="line-height:1.1; font-size:95%; padding:2px 10px;"| 
|
|-
| colspan=9 style="border-left:3px solid #28368C;"|Tournament cancelled due to impacts of the SARS outbreak in 2003.
|-
| style="border-left:3px solid #28368C;"| 2004
| National Stadium
|
|24–19
|
|style="border-right:0px;"| 
|style="border-left:0px;"| 
|style="line-height:1.1; font-size:95%; padding:2px 10px;"| 
|
|-
| style="border-left:3px solid #28368C;"| 2005
| National Stadium
|
|26–5
|
| style="border-right:0px;"| 
| style="border-left:0px;"| 
|style="line-height:1.1; font-size:95%; padding:2px 10px;"| 
|
|-
| style="border-left:3px solid #28368C;"| 2006
| National Stadium
|
|40–21
|
|style="border-right:0px;"| 
|style="border-left:0px;"| 
|style="line-height:1.1; font-size:95%; padding:2px 10px;"| 
|
|- bgcolor=lightgrey style="line-height:9px; font-size:85%; padding:0px;"
|style="border-left:0px;" | ||
|style="font-weight:bold;" | Winner
|style="font-weight:bold;" | Score
|style="font-weight:bold;" | Runner-up
|style="font-weight:bold;" | Third
|style="font-weight:bold;" | Fourth
|colspan=2 style="font-weight:bold; text-align:left;"| Plate·Bowl·Shield
|-
| 2013
|Yio Chu Kang Stadium
|
|24–19
|
|
|
|style="line-height:1.1; font-size:95%; padding:2px 10px;"| n/a
|
|-
| style="border-left:3px solid #28368C;"| 2016
|National Stadium
|
|30–7
|
|
|
|style="line-height:1.1; font-size:95%; padding:2px 10px;"| 
|
|- bgcolor=lightgrey style="line-height:9px; font-size:85%; padding:0px;"
|style="border-left:0px;" | ||
|style="font-weight:bold;" | Winner
|style="font-weight:bold;" | Score
|style="font-weight:bold;" | Runner-up
|style="font-weight:bold;" | Third
|style="font-weight:bold;" | Fourth
|style="font-weight:bold;" | Fifth
|style="font-weight:bold;" |
|-
| style="border-left:3px solid #28368C;"| 2017
| National Stadium
|
|26–19
|
|
|
|
|
|-
| style="border-left:3px solid #28368C;"| 2018
|National Stadium
|
|28–22
|
|
|
|
|
|-
| style="border-left:3px solid #28368C;"| 2019
|National Stadium
|
|20–19
|
|
|
|
|
|-
| colspan=100% style="border-left:3px solid #28368C;" | Tournaments planned for Singapore were cancelled in 2020 and 2021, due to impacts of the COVID-19 pandemic.|-
| style="border-left:3px solid #28368C;"| 2022
|National Stadium
|
|28–17 
|
|
|
|
|
|}

Key:Blue border on the left indicates tournaments in the World Rugby Sevens Series.''

References

External links

, on 16 & 17 April 2016 at the National Stadium, Singapore. Official website
'''', on 13 & 14 April 2019 at the National Stadium, Singapore. Official website

 
Singapore
International rugby union competitions hosted by Singapore
Recurring sporting events established in 2002
2002 establishments in Singapore